The sulphur-bellied tyrannulet (Mecocerculus minor) is a species of bird in the family Tyrannidae. It is found in the eastern Andes of Colombia, Ecuador and Peru. Its natural habitat is subtropical or tropical moist montane forests.

References

sulphur-bellied tyrannulet
Birds of the Colombian Andes
Birds of the Ecuadorian Andes
Birds of the Peruvian Andes
sulphur-bellied tyrannulet
sulphur-bellied tyrannulet
Taxonomy articles created by Polbot